Saksri Yamnadda, 17 October 1930 – 3 January 2002) was a Thai scholar. He was an expert in the Thai language, literature and poetry, and taught Thai language, as well as Pali and Sanskrit, as a professor at the Faculty of Arts of Chulalongkorn University. He wrote several textbooks on Thai literature, and translated over 100 works of Sanskrit literature into Thai.

References

Saksri Yamnadda
Saksri Yamnadda
Saksri Yamnadda
Saksri Yamnadda
Saksri Yamnadda
1930 births
2002 deaths
20th-century linguists